HotelsByDay is a provider of intraday hotel spaces, that is still in  a duration from four to nine hours daily, usually between 10 am and 8 pm, launched in 2015.

History
HotelsByDay originally launched with 30 hotels in both New York and Chicago. As of December 2016, over 500 hotels in 270 cities worldwide are available through the platform.

The service was co-founded by Yannis Moati, Nathan Stevenson, and Brian Dass.

In March 2016, HotelsByDay launched a sister app and website, named FlexBook, meant to provide overnight hotel room stays with extended check in/out options, in an attempt to fix needing to purchase extra nights to accommodate an early check in or late check out.

Development

February, 2015: Launch of HotelsByDay website and app
February 2016: Integration with eRevMax
February 2016: Pitched at Startupalooza
March 2017: HotelsByDay launches sister platform FlexBook, a website and app providing custom booking with early check in/late check out options for overnight stays
February 2017: Pitched on ABC's financier television program Shark Tank

References 

American travel websites